Whiteville is an unincorporated community in St. Landry Parish, Louisiana, United States. It is located approximately 20 miles north of Opelousas along Louisiana Highway 29.

The community is part of the Opelousas–Eunice Micropolitan Statistical Area.

References 

Unincorporated communities in St. Landry Parish, Louisiana
Unincorporated communities in Louisiana